In astrology, an aspect is an angle a planet makes to another planet or point of astrological interest. As the second-brightest object in the night sky after the Moon, often prominent during the morning or evening, Venus has aspects that are readily apparent to the casual eye. They were of historical importance in the development of geocentric and ultimately heliocentric models of the Solar System.

Aspects of the planet Venus
The table contains special positions of Venus until 2021. In general, Venus (or Mercury) is an "evening star" when it has an eastern elongation from the Sun, and is a "morning star" when it has a western elongation.

Note: Greatest brilliancy is often confused with "maximum brightness". Although they are related, they are not quite the same thing. The "greatest brilliancy" is really a geometric maximum: it occurs when the apparent area of the sunlit part of Venus is greatest. Only if the luminance of Venus' apparent surface would be constant (i.e. the same at every point and at every phase) would the "greatest brilliancy" of Venus coincide with its maximum brightness.  However, the reflection of sunlight on Venus more closely follows Lambert's law, which means that the maximum brightness occurs at a somewhat larger phase of Venus than its greatest brilliancy.

See also
 Ashen light
 Hesperus (evening star), the planet Venus
 Phosphorus (morning star), the planet Venus
 Planetary conjunction
 Retrograde motion
 Transit of Venus

References

Bibliography
 U.S. Naval Observatory. Multiyear Interactive Computer Almanac, 1800–2050.

External links
 Venus Phase Cycle, 1900–2050 (88 kB)

Venus in culture
Astrometry